Injustice is a 2021 American adult animated superhero film based on the 2013 video game of the same name, developed by NetherRealm Studios and based on characters from DC Comics. Produced by Warner Bros. Animation, DC Entertainment, and distributed by Warner Bros. Home Entertainment, it is the 43rd installment in the DC Universe Animated Original Movies (DCUAOM) line. The film is directed by Matt Peters from a story by Ernie Altbacker and stars Justin Hartley and Anson Mount as Superman and Batman, respectively. The film, set in a separate continuity from the main DC Universe, follows Superman’s descent into madness after being tricked by Joker into killing his pregnant wife Lois Lane and detonating a nuclear weapon that destroys Metropolis. As Superman transforms the Earth into a police state to enforce global peace, Batman forms an underground resistance to oppose Superman and his allies.

The film was announced in May 2021, with Altbacker writing the script. The film adapts elements from both the Injustice video game and its prequel comic book series (primarily the Year One arc), but tells an original narrative which diverges from the source materials. The film received generally mixed reviews from critics, who praised its animation and voice acting performances, but criticized its rushed plot and deviation from the source material.

Plot
On Earth-22, Joker and Harley Quinn kill Jimmy Olsen, kidnap a pregnant Lois Lane, and steal a nuclear weapon, which they connect to a heart rate monitor surgically attached to Lois' heart. Upon hearing of Lois' capture, Batman calls in all Justice League members to find her. The Flash finds the Scarecrow dead in his lab and his supply of Fear Toxin missing, before being killed by a trap laid by Joker.

Lois’s husband, a panicked Superman eventually finds Joker and Harley hiding on a submarine, but is attacked by Doomsday upon confronting them, and proceeds to punch the monster into space. As the other heroes arrive and apprehend the Joker and Harley, Batman realizes that they have mixed the Fear Toxin with Kryptonite, and used it to make Superman hallucinate that he is fighting Doomsday; in reality, he has beaten Lois to death. Batman tries to warn Superman, but as he realizes what he did, it is too late; Lois' heartbeat stops, causing the nuke to detonate, destroying Metropolis and killing 11 million people.

Under Batman's interrogation, Joker reveals that he had grown tired of their losing battle and sought to try and corrupt Superman instead. Moments later, Superman crashes the interrogation. Acting out of grief and rage at the loss of his wife, unborn child and his city, Superman brutally kills Joker.

While Green Arrow takes Harley to his hideout to protect her from Superman's wrath, Superman reveals his identity before the United Nations and announces his intentions to bring peace to Earth, by force if necessary. The Justice League is left divided over Superman's actions; some members, such as Wonder Woman, support his new methods, while others, like Batman, keep their no-killing vow. Other heroes, such as Aquaman and Shazam, refuse to choose sides and leave the League.

Meanwhile, the United States government becomes concerned that Superman will interfere in their operations, and have Mirror Master kidnap Jonathan Kent as leverage against him. Superman begins to question his actions, but Wonder Woman reassures him that he is doing the right thing and offers to help him find Jonathan. Confronting Mirror Master, Wonder Woman learns Jonathan's whereabouts and takes his belt, which Superman uses to find and rescue his father. Elsewhere, Batman confronts the President and warns him that Superman will kill him if he finds out that he ordered Jonathan's capture.

Later, Superman visits Batman in the Batcave to make peace, but they get into an argument over their ideological views and Batman refuses to join Superman. While trying to stop Superman from relocating Arkham Asylum inmates to a more secure facility, Batman and Nightwing are shocked to discover that Robin has joined Superman. Harley, who has escaped from Green Arrow and decided to become a hero, releases the inmates, forcing Batman and Superman to temporarily put their differences aside to fight them. During the battle, Robin lashes out in anger and accidentally kills Nightwing, leading to Batman disowning him. After learning about the incident from Superman, Catwoman comforts Batman. Meanwhile, Nightwing meets Rama Kushna in the afterlife, who transforms him into Deadwing.

While Superman allies with Ra's al Ghul, Batman forms an underground resistance and makes plans to steal a red sun cannon from the Fortress of Solitude. During the break-in, Ra's kills the Atom and destroys the cannon, Superman overpowers Captain Atom, and Jonathan, whom Superman had been keeping safe at the Fortress, is accidentally killed by one of Green Arrow's arrows, causing a grief-stricken Superman to murder him in revenge. After Superman transforms the Earth into a police state using surveillance drones, Batman has Plastic Man break Mister Terrific out of prison and leaks video footage of Superman killing a group of partying teenagers inspired by Joker to ruin his public image.

In response, Superman dispatches Amazo to enforce global peace, but the android quickly turns violent as Ra's had secretly programmed it to kill Superman. Amazo, who is able to replicate Superman's powers, kills Hawkman and Cyborg, but Batman and his allies arrive and help Superman and Wonder Woman destroy the android. Meanwhile, Robin, having had a change of heart, duels and defeats Ra's with Deadwing's help.

Despite their aid, Superman prepares to have the insurgents arrested and incapacitates Wonder Woman after she turns on him, but is confronted by Superman from Earth-One, who was brought into this universe by Mr. Terrific. Earth-22 Superman defeats his counterpart as the latter was holding back, but surrenders after being met with Lois from Earth-9, who lost her Superman after becoming pregnant with his child, and she reminds Earth-22's Superman that life is sacred. Realizing how far he has fallen, Superman willingly agrees to be imprisoned. Although unsure of what will happen next, Batman makes preparations to rebuild the world and his life with Catwoman.

Cast

Production
In June 2021, an animated film based on the 2013 video game Injustice: Gods Among Us was announced. The voice cast for the film was announced the following month on July 21.

Release
Unlike the games, which are Rated T from the ESRB, the film is Rated R for Bloody Violence, making it the first R-Rated movie based on a T-Rated video games series since Tekken. The film was released on October 19, 2021 on Blu-ray, 4K Ultra HD and in digital format. The DVD was exclusively released for Walmart stores. On October 9, the entire film was leaked online, ten days before its planned release date.

The Blu-ray includes the featurette titled Adventures in Storytelling: Injustice – Crisis and Conflict, where the filmmakers discuss the production and themes of the movie, in addition to both parts of the animated Justice League TV show's episode "Injustice for All".

The movie made its linear debut in the United States on Adult Swim's Toonami block on February 19, 2023.

Reception

Critical reception
Injustice received mixed reviews.  Criticism was leveled at the unceremonious character deaths, poor character development, unfaithfulness to the source material and overstuffed plot. Some reviewers, however, praised the voice acting and animation.

Streaming and home media

The film debuted at the third position on the "NPD Videoscan First Alert" weekly rankings for overall home media sales and Blu-ray sales in the United States. According to The Numbers, it sold 43,317 Blu-ray units and 7,568 DVD units in its first week of release for a revenue of $1.16 million. It also ranked fifth on both Google Play and Vudu's VOD charts. In the United Kingdom, it debuted at the tenth rank on the Official Film Chart.

In the second week of its release in the United States, Injustice fell to the fifth rank on the Blu-ray sales chart and eighth rank in overall disc sales. At the end of October, it ranked tenth in overall disc sales during the month. The film re-entered Google Play's top 10 films chart in its third week, ranking fifth, falling to the tenth rank in the following week.

References

External links
 
 Injustice at The World's Finest

2020s American animated films
2020s direct-to-video animated superhero films
Adult animated superhero films
American animated superhero films
2021 animated films
2021 direct-to-video films
2020s superhero films
2021 films
Animated action films
American adult animated films
2020s English-language films
Animated films about revenge
Animated films based on video games
Injustice (franchise)
Films about parallel universes
Animated Justice League films
Works based on Warner Bros. video games
Films directed by Matt Peters